Mart Laga (May 15, 1936 – November 27, 1977) was an Estonian basketball player who competed for the Soviet Union in the EuroBasket 1955 and EuroBasket 1957 events.

Club career 
Started playing basketball in 1952 as a member of TRÜ basketball team (now Tartu Ülikool/Rock). 1956 he played in CSKA Moscow and he won a silver medal with the team of Moscow of Soviet Union League Championship.

Achievements

National Team 
 European Championships:   1955,  1957

Club 
 Estonian SSR Championship: 1956, 1960

References

Further reading 
 

1936 births
1977 deaths
Estonian men's basketball players
Soviet men's basketball players
University of Tartu basketball team players
Sportspeople from Tartu
Centers (basketball)